George Neville Gearry (17 December 1923 – 4 January 1990) was a New Zealand cricketer who played first-class cricket for Canterbury from 1953 to 1957.

George Gearry served in the New Zealand Expeditionary Force in World War II. In cricket, he was an all-rounder who often opened the bowling. His highest first-class score was 79 when Canterbury beat Auckland in 1955–56; he also took 4 for 79 in the first innings. His best bowling figures were 6 for 32 in Canterbury's innings victory over Wellington in 1953–54, in his second first-class match.

References

External links
 
George Gearry at CricketArchive

1923 births
1990 deaths
New Zealand cricketers
Cricketers from Christchurch
Canterbury cricketers
New Zealand military personnel of World War II